Lee Memorial Park is a historic park and national historic district located at Petersburg, Virginia. The district includes two contributing buildings, three contributing sites, and two contributing structures. They are the park superintendent's house, the bathhouse, Willcox Lake reservoir, the Civil War earthworks, the park's system of roadways, paths and trails, the park's general topography and the Lee Park Wild Flower and Bird Sanctuary created by the Works Progress Administration between 1935 and 1940. As part of the W.P.A. project, Petersburg artist Bessie Niemeyer Marshall painted 238 watercolors of Lee Park herbarium specimens.

It was listed on the National Register of Historic Places in 2000.

References

Parks on the National Register of Historic Places in Virginia
Historic districts on the National Register of Historic Places in Virginia
Works Progress Administration in Virginia
Buildings and structures in Petersburg, Virginia
National Register of Historic Places in Petersburg, Virginia